Thalia is a genus of tunicates belonging to the family Salpidae.

The genus has almost cosmopolitan distribution.

Species:

Thalia cicar 
Thalia democratica 
Thalia longicauda 
Thalia orientalis 
Thalia rhinoceros 
Thalia rhomboides 
Thalia sibogae 

Sperm and egg interaction has been studied to discover if there are any shared features with other marine invertebrates. It was found that they are closely related to Ascidians and supports the idea that Ascidians gave rise to them.

References

Tunicates